Pedro Miguel da Cunha Leal (born 28 April 1984, in Lisbon) is a Portuguese international rugby player and a regular on the World Rugby  Sevens World Series circuit. He plays as a fullback or a scrum-half.
 
He is widely considered Portugal's best player in rugby sevens, and in the 2006/07 IRB Sevens World Series he scored 20 tries from eight tournament appearances. 
He was the top scorer at the 2008 Hannover Sevens event, with 74 points. Leal is one of only nine players to have scored more than 1,000 points in the World Rugby Sevens World Series.

He played three games at the 2007 Rugby World Cup.

References

1984 births
Living people
Rugby union fullbacks
Portuguese rugby union players
Portugal international rugby sevens players
Male rugby sevens players
Rugby union players from Lisbon
Portugal international rugby union players